The 2007 M&M Meat Shops Canadian Junior Curling Championships was held February 3-11 at the Jack Gatecliff Arena and the St. Catharines Golf and Country Club in St. Catharines, Ontario. The winning teams represented Canada at the 2007 World Junior Curling Championships.

Men's

Teams

Standings

Results

Draw 1

Draw 2

Draw 3

Draw 4

Draw 5

Draw 6

Draw 7

Draw 8

Draw 9

Draw 10

Draw 11

Draw 12

Draw 13

Draw 14

Draw 15

Draw 16

Draw 17

Draw 18

Playoffs

Semifinal

Final

Women's

Teams

Standings

Results

Draw 1

Draw 2

Draw 3

Draw 4

Draw 5

Draw 6

Draw 7

Draw 8

Draw 9

Draw 10

Draw 11

Draw 12

Draw 13

Draw 14

Draw 15

Draw 16

Draw 17

Draw 18

Playoffs

Tiebreaker

Semi final

Final

Qualification

Ontario
The Pepsi Ontario Junior Curling Championships were held January 3-7 at the Brockville Country Club in Brockville.

Hollie Nicol of the KW Granite Club defeated Brit O'Neill from the Glendale club in Hamilton 8-6 in the women's final. Nicol had beaten the Rachel Homan rink from the City View club in Ottawa 9-4 in the semifinals. 

In the men's final, Ryan Myler out of Brampton defeated Christian Tolusso of Manotick 5-4. Myler had beaten Scott McDonald of London in the semifinal.

External links
Women's statistics 
Men's statistics

References

Canadian Junior Curling Championships
Canadian Junior Curling Championships
Sport in St. Catharines
Curling in Ontario
Canadian Junior Curling Championships
February 2007 sports events in North America